

Destruction Was My Beatrice: Dada and the Unmaking of the Twentieth Century by Jed Rasula is a narrative history of the Dada movement, its birth in Zurich, Switzerland during World War I, its rapid spread and sudden decline throughout Europe, and the political and cultural legacy it left behind.

Reviews

Release information 
 Hardcover:  June 2, 2015 (First Edition), Basic Books, 384pp. .

About the author
 
Jed Rasula is the Helen S. Lanier Distinguished Professor of English at the University of Georgia.

References

External links
 Jed Rasula on Dada, University of Pennsylvania 

Works about avant-garde and experimental art